Chamaenerion fleischeri, formerly Epilobium fleischeri, commonly known as Alpine willowherb, is a herbaceous perennial plant of the family Onagraceae.

Description
 The biological life-form of Chamaenerion fleischeri is scapose hemicryptophyte, as its overwintering buds are situated just below the soil surface and the floral axis is more or less erect with a few leaves. This plant reaches on average  in height. The stem is erect and the leaves are usually glabrous and toothed. This plant is quite similar to Chamaenerion dodonaei, but that is much taller and has bristly leaves.

Chamaenerion fleischeri has fragrant flowers with four pointed thin dark purple sepals and four bright pink ovate petals. Flowering occurs from late June to August.

Distribution
This plant is endemic to the Alps, in France, Germany, Italy, Switzerland and Austria.

Habitat
It grows in clusters on moraines, in glaciers, among piles of stones and in alluvial deposits.

Gallery

References

 Clarins

External links
 Schede di Botanica

fleischeri